Richňava is one of the lakes near Banská Štiavnica in Slovakia. These lakes (or tajchy as locals call them) were created as water reservoirs for the mining industry.

Artificial lakes of Slovakia